Kurtis Lau Wai-kin , better known as Toyz, is a Hong Kong esports personality and YouTuber. He is a former professional League of Legends player, best known for winning the Season 2 World Championship as the mid laner for Taipei Assassins. Following his retirement in late 2015, he transitioned to several coaching and managerial roles for esports teams in Taiwan before switching focus to his YouTube channel.

Lau was arrested by Taiwanese police in late 2021 on suspicion of trafficking marijuana. He pled guilty to drug trafficking charges the following year and was sentenced to 4 years and 2 months in prison.

Career 
After starting his competitive career by playing for the amateur team CrossGaming in 2011, Lau was recruited by Taipei Assassins in April 2012, with whom he went on to win the Season 2 World Championship. Although he was successful while playing for Taipei Assassins, in June 2013 he was forced to retire from professional play because of carpal tunnel syndrome.

In 2014, he coached for the European team Fnatic during their run in the 2014 World Championship, which ended in the group stage. However, Lau returned to professional play in 2015, forming the Hong Kong Esports team together with former Taipei Assassins teammate Wang "Stanley" June-tsan. Lau left Hong Kong Esports on 14 October 2015, after making a lengthy post on his Facebook account accusing the team's CEO, Derek Cheung, of match fixing on September.

On 12 September 2016, Lau founded Raise Gaming to compete in the Elite Challenger Series (ECS), the secondary league of the League of Legends Master Series (LMS), with the goal of qualifying for the promotion tournament. Under Lau's coaching the team placed first in the 2017 ECS Spring regular season and second in playoffs. The team qualified for the LMS after defeating Team Yetti in the promotion tournament. When the team rebranded to G-Rex on 15 September 2017, Lau stayed with the team as a coach, before becoming the organisation's Director of Esports in mid-2018. He left G-Rex at the end of 2019.

Notable tournament results

Awards 
In 2019, the Hong Kong government awarded Lau with the Medal of Honour for his contributions to esports in Hong Kong.

Arrest 
Taiwanese police in Taichung arrested Lau on suspicion of trafficking marijuana on 29 September 2021. He subsequently pled guilty to drug trafficking charges on 16 June 2022 and was later sentenced to 4 years and 2 months in prison.

References

External links 
 

Hong Kong esports players
League of Legends coaches
Living people
League of Legends mid lane players
Fnatic coaches
Taipei Assassins players
Hong Kong emigrants to Taiwan
1992 births